Laozi, also known by numerous other names, was a semilegendary ancient Chinese Taoist philosopher. Laozi is a Chinese honorific, generally translated as "the Old Master". Chinese folk religion holds that he then became an immortal hermit or a god of the celestial bureaucracy under the name Laojun, one of the Three Pure Ones.

A central figure in Chinese culture, Laozi is generally considered the founder of philosophical and religious Taoism. He was claimed and revered as the ancestor of the 7th10th century Tang dynasty and is similarly honored in modern China with the popular surname Li. His work had a profound influence on subsequent Chinese religious movements and on subsequent Chinese philosophers, who annotated, commended, and criticized his work extensively.  Since the 20th century, however, archeological finds and textual criticism have caused some modern historians to question Laozi's timing or even existence, believing that the received text of the Tao Te Ching was not composed until the 4th centuryBC Warring States Period.

Names 
Laozi is the modern pinyin romanization of the Standard Mandarin pronunciation of the characters . It is not a name but an honorific title, meaning "old" or "venerable master". The character  has several meanings, including "son", "person", "viscount", and "master", and some Taoistsparticularly in Englishhave preferred to parse the title as meaning "Old Child" or "Old Boy", whether in reference to legends of Laozi being born already an old man or to his playful philosophy. However, the structure of the name exactly matches that of other ancient Chinese philosophers such as Kongzi, Mengzi, Zhuangzi, &c. and in context can only have the meaning of "master". The title has been extremely variously romanized, including Lao Zi, Lao Tzu or Tzŭ, Lao-tzu, Lao Tse, Lao-tse, Lao Tze, Lao-tze, Laotze, Lao Tsu, and Lao-tsu but, compared with Confucius and Mencius, the latinized form Laocius has been relatively uncommon in English. "Lao-tse" was the most common romanization during the 19th century before being supplanted by Wade-Giles "Lao-tzu" and "Lao Tzu" around the 1920s; the pinyin form "Laozi" finally became more common in English during the 1990s.

Traditional accounts give Laozi the personal name Li Er (Lǐ Ěr), whose Old Chinese pronunciation has been reconstructed as *C.rəʔ C.nəʔ. Li is a common Chinese surname but literally means "plum tree"; because of legends tying Laozi's birth to a plum, he has been venerated as the ancestor of all subsequent Lis, including the ruling family of the Tang dynasty. The character  was the ancient Chinese word for "ear" or "ears". Laozi's prominent posthumous name Dan (Dān) similarly means "Long-Ear" or "the Long-Eared One". These names have also been variously written as Li Erh, Li Dan, Lao Dan, Lao Tan, and Laodan.

Laozi is recorded bearing the courtesy name Boyang (Bóyáng), whose Old Chinese pronunciation has been reconstructed as *pˤrak laŋ. The character  was the title of a senior uncle of the father's family, also used as a noble title equivalent to a count and as a general mark of respect, and the character  is yang, the solar and masculine life force in Taoist belief. Lao Dan seems to have been used more generally, however, including by Sima Qian in his Records of the Grand Historian, by Zhuangzi's in his eponymous Taoist classic, and by some modern scholars.

Under the Tang, Laozi received a series of temple names of increasing grandeur. In the year 666, Emperor Gaozong named Laozi the "Supremely Mysterious and Primordial Emperor"  Tàishàng Xuán Yuán Huángdì). In 743, Emperor Xuanzong declared him the "Sage Ancestor"  Shèngzǔ) of the dynasty with the posthumous title of "Mysterious and Primordial Emperor"  Xuán Yuán Huángdì). Emperor Xuanzong also elevated Laozi's parents to the ranks of "Innately Supreme Emperor"  Xiāntiān Tàishàng Huáng) and "Innate Empress"  Xiāntiān Tàihòu). In 749, Laozi was further honored as the "Sage Ancestor and Mysterious and Primordial Emperor of the Great Way"  Shèngzǔ Dàdào Xuán Yuán Huángdì) and then, in 754, as the "Great Sage Ancestor and Mysterious and Primordial Heavenly Emperor and Great Sovereign of the Golden Palace of the High and Supreme Great Way"  Dà Shèngzǔ Gāo Shǎng Dàdào Jīnquē Xuán Yuán Tiānhuáng Dàdì).

Historical views 
In the mid-twentieth century, a consensus emerged among Western scholars that the historicity of the person known as Laozi is doubtful and that the Tao Te Ching was "a compilation of Taoist sayings by many hands". Following new archaeological discoveries, many Chinese scholars have reverted to affirming the existence of a historical Laozi.

The earliest certain reference to the present figure of Laozi is found in the 1st‑centuryBC Records of the Grand Historian collected by the historian Sima Qian from earlier accounts. In one account, Laozi was said to be a contemporary of Confucius during the 6th or 5th centuryBC. His personal name was Er or Dan. He was an official in the imperial archives and wrote a book in two parts before departing to the west. In another, Laozi was a different contemporary of Confucius titled Lao Laizi  and wrote a book in 15 parts. In a third, he was the court astrologer Lao Dan who lived during the 4th centuryBC reign of the Duke Xian of Qin. The oldest text of the Tao Te Ching so far recovered was part of the Guodian Chu Slips. It was written on bamboo slips, and dates to the late 4th centuryBC.

According to traditional accounts, Laozi was a scholar who worked as the Keeper of the Archives for the royal court of Zhou. This reportedly allowed him broad access to the works of the Yellow Emperor and other classics of the time. The stories assert that Laozi never opened a formal school but nonetheless attracted a large number of students and loyal disciples. There are many variations of a story retelling his encounter with Confucius, most famously in the Zhuangzi.

Sima Qian reports that Laozi was born in the village of Quren (Qūrén lǐ) in the southern state of Chu, within present-day Luyi in Henan.. He was said to be the son of the Censor-in-Chief of the Zhou dynasty and Lady Yishou (Yìshòu shì). In accounts where Laozi married, he was said to have had a son who became a celebrated soldier of Wei during the Warring States period.

The story tells of Zong the Warrior who defeats an enemy and triumphs, and then abandons the corpses of the enemy soldiers to be eaten by vultures. By coincidence Laozi, traveling and teaching the way of the Tao, comes on the scene and is revealed to be the father of Zong, from whom he was separated in childhood. Laozi tells his son that it is better to treat respectfully a beaten enemy, and that the disrespect to their dead would cause his foes to seek revenge. Convinced, Zong orders his soldiers to bury the enemy dead. Funeral mourning is held for the dead of both parties and a lasting peace is made.

Many clans of the Li family trace their descent to Laozi, including the emperors of the Tang dynasty. This family was known as the Longxi Li lineage (隴西李氏). According to the Simpkinses, while many (if not all) of these lineages are questionable, they provide a testament to Laozi's impact on Chinese culture.

The third story in Sima Qian states that Laozi grew weary of the moral decay of life in Chengzhou and noted the kingdom's decline. He ventured west to live as a hermit in the unsettled frontier at the age of 80. At the western gate of the city (or kingdom), he was recognized by the guard Yinxi. The sentry asked the old master to record his wisdom for the good of the country before he would be permitted to pass. The text Laozi wrote was said to be the Tao Te Ching, although the present version of the text includes additions from later periods. In some versions of the tale, the sentry was so touched by the work that he became a disciple and left with Laozi, never to be seen again. In others, the "Old Master" journeyed all the way to India and was the teacher of Siddartha Gautama, the Buddha. Others say he was the Buddha himself.

A seventh-century work, the Sandong Zhunang ("Pearly Bag of the Three Caverns"), embellished the relationship between Laozi and Yinxi. Laozi pretended to be a farmer when reaching the western gate, but was recognized by Yinxi, who asked to be taught by the great master. Laozi was not satisfied by simply being noticed by the guard and demanded an explanation. Yinxi expressed his deep desire to find the Tao and explained that his long study of astrology allowed him to recognize Laozi's approach. Yinxi was accepted by Laozi as a disciple. This is considered an exemplary interaction between Taoist master and disciple, reflecting the testing a seeker must undergo before being accepted. A would-be adherent is expected to prove his determination and talent, clearly expressing his wishes and showing that he had made progress on his own towards realizing the Tao.

The Pearly Bag of the Three Caverns continues the parallel of an adherent's quest. Yinxi received his ordination when Laozi transmitted the Tao Te Ching, along with other texts and precepts, just as Taoist adherents receive a number of methods, teachings and scriptures at ordination. This is only an initial ordination and Yinxi still needed an additional period to perfect his virtue, thus Laozi gave him three years to perfect his Tao. Yinxi gave himself over to a full-time devotional life. After the appointed time, Yinxi again demonstrates determination and perfect trust, sending out a black sheep to market as the agreed sign. He eventually meets again with Laozi, who announces that Yinxi's immortal name is listed in the heavens and calls down a heavenly procession to clothe Yinxi in the garb of immortals. The story continues that Laozi bestowed a number of titles upon Yinxi and took him on a journey throughout the universe, even into the nine heavens. After this fantastic journey, the two sages set out to western lands of the barbarians. The training period, reuniting and travels represent the attainment of the highest religious rank in medieval Taoism called "Preceptor of the Three Caverns". In this legend, Laozi is the perfect Taoist master and Yinxi is the ideal Taoist student. Laozi is presented as the Tao personified, giving his teaching to humanity for their salvation. Yinxi follows the formal sequence of preparation, testing, training and attainment.

The story of Laozi has taken on strong religious overtones since the Han dynasty. As Taoism took root, Laozi was worshipped as a god. Belief in the revelation of the Tao from the divine Laozi resulted in the formation of the Way of the Celestial Masters, the first organized religious Taoist sect. In later mature Taoist tradition, Laozi came to be seen as a personification of the Tao. He is said to have undergone numerous "transformations" and taken on various guises in various incarnations throughout history to initiate the faithful in the Way. Religious Taoism often holds that the "Old Master" did not disappear after writing the Tao Te Ching but rather spent his life traveling and revealing the Tao.

Taoist myths state that Laozi was a virgin birth, conceived when his mother gazed upon a falling star. He supposedly remained in her womb for 62 years before being born while his mother was leaning against a plum tree. (The Chinese surname Li literally means "plum tree".) Laozi was said to have emerged as a grown man with a full grey beard and long earlobes, both symbols of wisdom and long life. Other myths state that he was reborn 13 times after his first life during the days of Fuxi. In his last incarnation as Laozi, he lived nine hundred and ninety years and spent his life traveling to reveal the Tao.

Tao Te Ching 

Laozi is traditionally regarded as the author of the Tao Te Ching, though the identity of its author(s) or compiler(s) has been debated throughout history. It is one of the most significant treatises in Chinese cosmogony. As with most other ancient Chinese philosophers, Laozi often explains his ideas by way of paradox, analogy, appropriation of ancient sayings, repetition, symmetry, rhyme, and rhythm. In fact, the whole book can be read as an analogy – the ruler is the awareness, or self, in meditation and the myriad creatures or empire is the experience of the body, senses and desires.

The Tao Te Ching, often called simply Laozi after its reputed author, describes the Tao as the source and ideal of all existence: it is unseen, but not transcendent, immensely powerful yet supremely humble, being the root of all things. People have desires and free will (and thus are able to alter their own nature). Many act "unnaturally", upsetting the natural balance of the Tao. The Tao Te Ching intends to lead students to a "return" to their natural state, in harmony with Tao. Language and conventional wisdom are critically assessed. Taoism views them as inherently biased and artificial, widely using paradoxes to sharpen the point.

Livia Kohn provides an example of how Laozi encouraged a change in approach, or return to "nature", rather than action. Technology may bring about a false sense of progress. The answer provided by Laozi is not the rejection of technology, but instead seeking the calm state of wu wei, free from desires. This relates to many statements by Laozi encouraging rulers to keep their people in "ignorance", or "simple-minded". Some scholars insist this explanation ignores the religious context, and others question it as an apologetic of the philosophical coherence of the text. It would not be unusual political advice if Laozi literally intended to tell rulers to keep their people ignorant. However, some terms in the text, such as "valley spirit" (gushen) and "soul" (po), bear a metaphysical context and cannot be easily reconciled with a purely ethical reading of the work.

Wu wei (無為), literally "non-action" or "not acting", is a central concept of the Tao Te Ching. The concept of wu wei is multifaceted, and reflected in the words' multiple meanings, even in English translation; it can mean "not doing anything", "not forcing", "not acting" in the theatrical sense, "creating nothingness", "acting spontaneously", and "flowing with the moment".

It is a concept used to explain ziran (自然), or harmony with the Tao. It includes the concepts that value distinctions are ideological and seeing ambition of all sorts as originating from the same source. Laozi used the term broadly with simplicity and humility as key virtues, often in contrast to selfish action. On a political level, it means avoiding such circumstances as war, harsh laws and heavy taxes. Some Taoists see a connection between wu wei and esoteric practices, such as zuowang "sitting in oblivion" (emptying the mind of bodily awareness and thought) found in the Zhuangzi.

Influence 

Potential officials throughout Chinese history drew on the authority of non-Confucian sages, especially Laozi and Zhuangzi, to deny serving any ruler at any time. Zhuangzi, Laozi's most famous follower in traditional accounts, had a great deal of influence on Chinese literati and culture. Laozi influenced millions of Chinese people by his psychological understanding. He persuaded people by his inaction and non-speaking.

Political theorists influenced by Laozi have advocated humility in leadership and a restrained approach to statecraft, either for ethical and pacifist reasons, or for tactical ends. In a different context, various antiauthoritarian movements have embraced Laozi's teachings on the power of the weak.

Laozi was a proponent of limited government. Left-libertarians in particular have been influenced by Laozi – in his 1937 book Nationalism and Culture, the anarcho-syndicalist writer and activist Rudolf Rocker praised Laozi's "gentle wisdom" and understanding of the opposition between political power and the cultural activities of the people and community. In his 1910 article for the Encyclopædia Britannica, Peter Kropotkin also noted that Laozi was among the earliest proponents of essentially anarchist concepts. More recently, anarchists such as John P. Clark and Ursula K. Le Guin have written about the conjunction between anarchism and Taoism in various ways, highlighting the teachings of Laozi in particular. In her rendition of the Tao Te Ching, Le Guin writes that Laozi "does not see political power as magic. He sees rightful power as earned and wrongful power as usurped... He sees sacrifice of self or others as a corruption of power, and power as available to anyone who follows the Way. No wonder anarchists and Taoists make good friends."

The right-libertarian economist Murray Rothbard suggested that Laozi was the first libertarian, likening Laozi's ideas on government to Friedrich Hayek's theory of spontaneous order. James A. Dorn agreed, writing that Laozi, like many 18th-century liberals, "argued that minimizing the role of government and letting individuals develop spontaneously would best achieve social and economic harmony." Similarly, the Cato Institute's David Boaz includes passages from the Tao Te Ching''' in his 1997 book The Libertarian Reader and noted in an article for the Encyclopædia Britannica'' that Laozi advocated for rulers to "do nothing" because "without law or compulsion, men would dwell in harmony." Philosopher Roderick Long argues that libertarian themes in Taoist thought are actually borrowed from earlier Confucian writers.

References

Citations

Sources 

 
 
 
 .
 
 .
 .
 .
 
 
 
 
 
 
 
 
 
 
 
  
 .

Further reading 

 .
 .

External links 
 
 
 
 
 Stanford Encyclopedia of Philosophy: Laozi
 Internet Encyclopedia of Philosophy: Laozi

 
6th-century BC deaths
6th-century BC Chinese philosophers
7th-century BC births
Founders of religions
Investiture of the Gods characters
Libertarian theorists
Metaphysicians
Ontologists
People whose existence is disputed
Philosophers of culture
Philosophers of mind
Proto-anarchists
Chinese political philosophers
Chinese social commentators
Social philosophers
Taoist immortals
Zhou dynasty philosophers
Zhou dynasty Taoists
Deified Chinese people